Sivasubramaniam a/l Athinarayanan, also known as A. Sivasubramaniam is a Malaysian politician from who served as a member of Perak State Legislative Assembly for Buntong from 2008 to 2022. He is a member of Malaysian United Indigenous Party a major component party of the Perikatan Nasional coalition. Previously, he was a member of Democratic Action Party a component party of Pakatan Harapan coalition.

Education 
He is a Bachelor of Business Administration from Open University Malaysia.

Politics 
He is a member of Perak State Legislative Assembly for Buntong since 2008 representing Democratic Action Party from Pakatan Rakyat and later Pakatan Harapan.

In 2020, he together with Paul Yong Choo Kiong and Norhizam Hassan Baktee has been expelled from Democratic Action Party as they supported Perikatan Nasional. This causes them to be expelled by the Chairman of Disciplinary Committee of DAP, Chong Chieng Jen. After the expulsion, he had joined GERAKAN and BERSATU before joining PBM.  He rejoined BERSATU on 15 September 2022, the 4th time he has "jumped" like a frog in 2½ years from one political party to another, with former Bercham state assemblyman Sum Cheok Leng.

Election results

References 

Living people
Members of the Perak State Legislative Assembly
Malaysian politicians of Indian descent
1966 births